Matthias Hollwich (born May 1, 1971 in Munich) is principal and founder of New York architecture firm HWKN Architecture (HWKN), a published author, and co-founder of Architizer.com.
His work has been published in publications such as Wallpaper*, the New York Times, Wall Street Journal, Mark, Bauwelt, Dwell and Architectural Digest.

Early work 
Matthias Hollwich worked for a number of internationally acclaimed architectural firms and urban design studios including Rem Koolhaas’ Office of Metropolitan Architecture (OMA) in Rotterdam and Hong Kong, Eisenman Architects and Diller+Scofidio in New York City. His work at OMA includes the design of the McCormick Tribune Campus Center at the Illinois Institute of Technology in Chicago, the Dutch Embassy in Berlin, and Casa da Musica in Porto.

HWKN Architecture (HWKN) 
Matthias Hollwich is the founder of HWKN, a NY-based collective of architects, sculptors, social strategists and innovators dedicated to use architecture to shape a better world. Matthias was born and raised in Germany where he studied architecture and brings a dual perspective to all the firm’s designs, combining German precision with American aspiration. In 2012 HWKN won MoMA PS1's Young Architects Program (YAP) with their project Wendy. Following the success of Wendy, HWKN received multiple commissions including the Fire Island Pines Pavilion (2013), the University of Pennsylvania’s LEED Gold Pennovation Center (2016), Journal Squared (2017), and the speculative innovation campus 25 Kent (2018). In 2017, the firm was included in Fast Company's ranking of the World's Most Innovative companies.

Architizer 
During the 2008 Global Financial Crisis, Matthias co-created Architizer, a digital platform to help architects promote their work. Architizer rapidly grew to become the largest platform for architecture online. To increase visibility of global architecture, Matthias co-developed the Architizer A+ Awards in 2013. The awards program has grown to become the largest globally recognized architecture distinction.

New Aging 
Matthias Hollwich is a recognized thought leader on the topic of Aging regularly speaking at events such as TEDx, SXSW and for the World Health Organization. In 2008 he completed a master plan for Geropolis, a vision for every future city inspired by the aging population in 2020 with the Bauhaus Foundation. In 2010, Matthias organized a conference on aging at the University of Pennsylvania titled New Aging: Visiting the Future while he was a visiting professor at the University of Pennsylvania.

In 2015, Matthias signed a publishing agreement with Penguin Books for his book ‘New Aging - Live Smarter Now to Live Better Forever' with Bruce Mau Design.

Bauhaus 
As a member of the Bauhaus Dessau Werkstatt between 2002 and 2006, Matthias worked on multiple projects including design proposals for the new Master’s house in Dessau, Shrinking Cities research, and Geropolis.
In 2004, Matthias finished editing his first book with Rainer Weisbach at the Bauhaus titled ‘UmBauhaus – Updating Modernism’.

References

External links
http://hwkn.com/
http://www.huffingtonpost.com/jenn-kennedy/matthias-hollwich-boom-lgbt-retirement_b_1119541.html
http://www.design.upenn.edu/architecture/graduate/people/matthias-hollwich
http://www.penguinrandomhouse.com/books/318304/new-aging-by-matthias-hollwich-with-bruce-mau-design/9780143128106/
https://www.youtube.com/watch?v=fuNLPdeMF8E

Living people
21st-century German architects
1971 births